Marty Malone is an American politician serving as a member of the Montana House of Representatives from the 59th district. Elected in November 2020, he assumed office on January 4, 2021.

Early life and education 
Malone was born in Appleton, Wisconsin. He attended Pacific Lutheran University for one year and earned a Bachelor of Science degree in agricultural economics from Montana State University.

Career 
Prior to entering politics, Malone worked as a fleet sales manager and for the government of Montana. Malone was elected to the Montana House of Representatives in November 2020 and assumed office on January 4, 2021, succeeding Alan Redfield. Malone lives in Park County, Montana, where he operates a ranch.

References 

Living people
People from Appleton, Wisconsin
Montana State University alumni
Republican Party members of the Montana House of Representatives
People from Park County, Montana
1948 births